Kegel may refer to:

Uses
 Kegel exercise, a pelvic floor exercise
 Kegel (bowling), a traditional German version of nine-pin bowling

People with the surname
 Arnold Kegel (1894–1972), American gynecologist
 Charles Kegel (1924–1981), interim President of Idaho State University, US
 Friedrich Wilhelm Kegel (?–1948), Namibian mine director
 Herbert Kegel (1920–1990), German conductor
 Johann Karl Ehrenfried Kegel (1784–1863), German agronomist and explorer of the Kamchatka Peninsula

See also
 Heike Wilms-Kegel (born 1952), German politician